Lai Chu-long (born 10 March 1942) is a Taiwanese gymnast. He competed at the 1964 Summer Olympics and the 1968 Summer Olympics.

References

1942 births
Living people
Taiwanese male artistic gymnasts
Olympic gymnasts of Taiwan
Gymnasts at the 1964 Summer Olympics
Gymnasts at the 1968 Summer Olympics
Place of birth missing (living people)